Faizal is a masculine given name. It is also used as a surname. People with the name are as follows:

Given name

First name
 Faizal Arif (born 1995), Malaysian football player
 Faizal Hamid (born 1981), Singaporean football player
 Faizal Hussein (born 1967), Malaysian actor
 Faizal Kottikollon (born 1963), Indian businessman
 Faizal Maksum, Tajikistani fighter
 Faizal Muhamad (born 1989), Malaysian football player
 Faizal Raffi (born 1996), Singaporean football player
 Faizal Rani (born 1994), Malaysian football player 
 Faizal Rehman (born 1985), Indian football player 
 Faizal Saari (born 1991), Malaysian hockey player
 Faizal Tahir (born 1978), Malaysian musician
 Faizal Talib (born 1997), Malaysian football player
 Faizal Yusup (1978–2011), Malaysian actor
 Faizal Zainal (born 1974), Malaysian football player

Middle name
 Ahmad Faizal Azumu (born 1970), Malaysian politician
 Mohamed Faizal Baharom (born 1982), Malaysian weightlifter
 Mohamed Faizal Mohamed Abdul Kadir (born 1980), Singaporean lawyer
 Mohammed Faizal P. P (born 1975), Indian politician

Surname
 Cassim Faizal (born 1957), Sri Lankan politician
 F. S. Faizal, Indian music composer
 Hafiz Faizal (born 1994), Indonesian badminton player
 Hafsah Faizal (born 1993), American designer and author

Fictional characters
 Faizal, one of the major characters in the 2018 Indian film Love Sonia

Indian masculine given names
Malaysian masculine given names